Year 1559 (MDLIX) was a common year starting on Sunday (link will display the full calendar) of the Julian calendar.

Events 
<onlyinclude>

January–June 
 January 15 – Elizabeth I of England is crowned, in Westminster Abbey.
 February 27 – Queen Elizabeth I of England establishes the Church of England, with the Act of Uniformity 1558 and the Act of Supremacy 1558.  The Oath of Supremacy is reinstated.
 March 23 – Emperor Gelawdewos of Ethiopia, defending his lands against the invasion of Nur ibn Mujahid, Sultan of Harar, is killed in battle. His brother, Menas, succeeds him as king.
 April 2–3 – Peace of Cateau Cambrésis: France makes peace with England and Spain, ending the Italian War of 1551–59. France gives up most of its gains in Italy (including Savoy), retaining only Saluzzo, but keeps the three Lorraine bishoprics of Metz, Toul, and Verdun, and the formerly English town of Calais.
 May 2 – John Knox returns from exile to Scotland, to become the leader of the beginning Scottish Reformation.
 May 13 – At Basel, the body of Dutch Anabaptist leader David Joris is exhumed and burned, following his posthumous conviction of heresy.
 June 2 – A royal edict in France makes heresy punishable by death.
 June 11 – Scottish Reformation: A Protestant mob, incited by the preaching of John Knox, sacks St Andrews Cathedral.
 June 22 – King Philip II of Spain and the 14-year-old Elisabeth of Valois are married in Spain, having married by proxy in January. On June 30, the bride's father, King Henry II of France, is fatally injured in a jousting accident at the celebrations.

July–December 
 July 10 – 15-year old Francis II becomes King of France following the death of his father, Henry II. Members of the House of Guise and the new king's mother Catherine de' Medici dispute control over the kingdom.
July 31 – Pope Paul IV authorizes the creation of the University of Douai (which will later become the University of Lille).
 August 15 – Led by Don Tristán de Luna y Arellano, a Spanish missionary colony of 1,500 men, on 13 ships, arrives from Vera Cruz at Pensacola Bay, founding the oldest European settlement in the mainland U.S. (St. Augustine is founded in 1565.)
 September 4 – Gorkha state is established by Dravya Shah, beating local Khadka kings, which is the origin of the current country of Nepal.
 September 19 – Just weeks after arrival at Pensacola, the Spanish missionary colony is decimated by a hurricane that kills hundreds, sinks five ships, with a galleon, and grounds a caravel; the 1,000 survivors divide to relocate/resupply the settlement, but suffer famine & attacks, and abandon the effort in 1561.
 September 21 – The 15-year-old King Francis II of France is crowned at Reims.  The crown is too heavy for him, and has to be held in place by his nobles.
 December 25 – Pope Pius IV succeeds Pope Paul IV, as the 224th pope.

Date unknown 
 End of Reformation according to many historians.
 The University of Geneva is founded by John Calvin.
 John Calvin publishes the final edition of the Institutes of the Christian Religion.
 Oda Nobunaga wins control of his native province of Owari.
 Margaret of Parma becomes Governor of the Netherlands, in place of her brother, King Philip II of Spain.
 Jean Nicot, French ambassador to Portugal 1559–61, describes the medicinal properties of tobacco, which he introduces in the form of snuff to the French court.
 Pope Paul IV promulgates the Pauline Index, an early version of the Index Librorum Prohibitorum.

Births 

 January 1 – Virginia Eriksdotter, Swedish noble (d. 1633)
 January 8 – William Helyar, English chaplain (d. 1645)
 January 25 – Aleixo de Menezes, Roman Catholic archbishop (d. 1617)
 February 7 – Catherine de Bourbon, Princess of Navarre and Duchess consort of Lorraine (d. 1604)
 February 18 – Isaac Casaubon, French-born classical scholar (d. 1614)
 February 19 – Philip II, Margrave of Baden-Baden (d. 1588)
 February 21 – Nurhaci, Chinese emperor (d. 1626)
 March 12 – Christoph Brouwer, Dutch historian (d. 1617)
 March 16 – Amar Singh I, eldest son and successor of Maharana Pratap of Mewar (d. 1620)
 March 26 – Wolf Dietrich Raitenau, Prince-Bishop of Salzburg (d. 1617)
 May 4 – Alice Spencer, Countess of Derby, Baroness Ellesmere and Viscountess Brackley (d. 1637)
 May 12
Stanisław Radziwiłł, Grand Marshal of Lithuania (d. 1599)
Johann Georg Gödelmann, German demonologist (d. 1611)
 July 2 – Margareta Brahe, Swedish political activist  (d. 1638)
 July 22 – Lawrence of Brindisi, Italian saint (d. 1619)
 July 27 – Countess Palatine Barbara of Zweibrücken-Neuburg and Countess consort of Oettingen-Oettingen (d. 1618)
 August 18 – Frederik van den Bergh, Dutch soldier in the Eighty Years' War (d. 1618)
 August 24 or September 1556 – Sophia Brahe, Danish astronomer, horticulturalist (d. 1643)
 September 21 – Cigoli, Italian painter (d. 1613)
 September 15 – Edmond Richer, French theologian (d. 1631)
 October 12 or October 22 – Jacques Sirmond, French Jesuit scholar (d. 1651)
 November 11 – Tokuhime, Japanese noble (d. 1636)
 November 12 – Yaza Datu Kalaya, Crown Princess of Burma (d. 1603)
 November 13 – Al-Mansur al-Qasim, Imam of Yemen (d. 1620)
 November 15 – Albert VII, Archduke of Austria, Governor of the Low Countries (d. 1621)
 December 14 – Lupercio Leonardo de Argensola, Spanish writer (d. 1613)
 date unknown
 George Chapman, English dramatist (d. 1634)
 Ikeda Motosuke, Japanese military commander (d. 1584)
 John Penry, Welsh Protestant martyr (d. 1593)
 Honinbo Sansa, Japanese player of Go (d. 1623)
 John Spenser, president of Corpus Christi College, Oxford (d. 1614)

Deaths 

 January – Christina Gyllenstierna, leading opponent of King Christian II of Denmark and Norway (b. 1494)
 January 1 – King Christian III of Denmark and Norway (b. 1503)
 January 25 – King Christian II of Denmark, Norway and Sweden (b. 1481)
 February 12 – Prince-elector Otto Henry of the Palatinate (b. 1502)
 March 8 – Thomas Tresham, English Catholic politician
 March 13 – Johann Gropper, German Catholic cardinal (b. 1503)
 March 16 – Anthony St. Leger, Lord Deputy of Ireland (b. 1496)
 March 23 – Emperor Gelawdewos of Ethiopia (in battle) (b. 1522)
 March 30 – Adam Ries, German mathematician (b. 1492)
 June 3 – Elisabeth of Nassau-Siegen, German noblewoman (b. 1488)
 July 10 – King Henry II of France (jousting accident) (b. 1519)
 August 18 – Pope Paul IV (b. 1476)
 September 7 – Robert Estienne, French printer (b. 1503)
 September 15 – Isabella Jagiellon, queen consort of Hungary (d. 1519)
 October 2 – Jacquet of Mantua, French composer (b. 1483)
 October 3 – Ercole II d'Este, Duke of Ferrara, Italian noble (b. 1508)
 October 4 – Philip III, Count of Nassau-Weilburg (b. 1504)
 October 6 – William I, Count of Nassau-Siegen (b. 1487)
 November 5 – Kanō Motonobu, Japanese painter (b. 1476)
 November 10 – Jacob Milich, German astronomer and mathematician (b. 1501)
 November 18 – Cuthbert Tunstall, English church leader (b. 1474)
 November 20 – Frances Grey, Duchess of Suffolk, English noblewoman and claimant to the throne of England (b. 1517)
 November 26 – Adolph of Nassau-Saarbrücken, Count of Nassau (b. 1526)
 December 17 – Irene di Spilimbergo, Italian Renaissance poet and painter (b. 1538)
 December 31 – Owen Oglethorpe, deposed English bishop
 date unknown
 Realdo Colombo, Italian surgeon and anatomist (b. 1516)
 Elizabeth Wilford, English merchant and company founder
 Father Francis of Aberdeen, Catholic Trinitarian friar
 Leonard Digges, English mathematician and surveyor (b. c. 1515)
 Conn O'Neill, 1st Earl of Tyrone, Irish rebel (b. 1480)
 Wen Zhengming, Chinese painter (b. 1470)

References